David Wayne Howard (born February 26, 1967), is an American professional baseball scout and former Major League Baseball player. He was a utilityman who played in the majors from  through  for the Kansas City Royals (1991–97) and St. Louis Cardinals (1998–99). Listed at 6 feet (1.8 m) and 175 lb. (80 kg), he was a switch-hitter and threw right-handed. His father, pitcher Bruce Howard, played in the big leagues during the 1960s.

Before heading to college, Howard attended and played baseball for  Riverview High School. Howard attended the State College of Florida, Manatee–Sarasota. He was able to play all infield and outfield positions, and had the ability to serve as emergency pitcher. His most productive offensive season came in 1996, when he posted career highs in games (143), runs (51), hits (92), extrabases (23) and RBI (48), while hitting a .243 batting average. On June 10th, 1997, in the 5th inning of a game against the Anaheim Angels, Howard hit a long fly ball over the head of Jim Edmonds. Edmonds would make a spectacular over-the-shoulder diving catch to rob Howard of extra bases. The catch is considered one of the greatest catches in MLB history.  In a nine-season career, Howard was a .229 hitter (362-for-1,583) with 11 home runs and 148 RBI in 645 total games, including 169 runs, 57 doubles, 14 triples, and 23 stolen bases. In the field, Howard most frequently played shortstop (361 games), second base (142) and the outfield (66).

Howard began his coaching career in the New York Mets' farm system in 2001. In , he joined the Boston Red Sox as a minor league instructor before becoming a scout. He moved into their front office at the close of the 2007 season, spending 2008–09 as special assistant to Boston general manager Theo Epstein.  In 2010, he succeeded Rob Leary as the Red Sox' field coordinator of minor league instruction and served in that role through . He was named special assignment scout by the Chicago Cubs in 2019, reuniting him with Epstein.

See also
List of second-generation Major League Baseball players

References

External links
The Baseball Cube
Baseball Reference
Retrosheet

1967 births
Living people
Appleton Foxes players
Baseball City Royals players
Baseball players from Florida
Boston Red Sox scouts
Chicago Cubs scouts
Fort Myers Royals players
Kansas City Royals players
Major League Baseball infielders
Major League Baseball outfielders
Memphis Chicks players
Memphis Redbirds players
Norfolk Tides players
Omaha Royals players
St. Louis Cardinals players
SCF Manatees baseball players
Sportspeople from Sarasota, Florida

Riverview High School (Sarasota, Florida) alumni